Manfred Schüler (born March 7, 1932 in Jessen) is a German financial and management expert and politician (SPD).

After teaching management and business studies activities at several scientific institutes and the private sector, since 1958 he has been a member of the SPD for issues of financial reform in the Bundestag.

After the change of government in 1969, he became head of the German Chancellery from 1974 to 1980 under Chancellor Helmut Schmidt. In 1999, he became the last Chairman of the Board of Directors of the Federal Institute for Unification (BvS), and then from 2000 to 2003, Chairman of the Board of TLG.

References

German economists
1932 births
Living people
Social Democratic Party of Germany politicians
Heads of the German Chancellery
Knights Commander of the Order of Merit of the Federal Republic of Germany